The Gauge Change Train (GCT) or  is the name given to a Japanese project started in 1994 to develop a high-speed train with variable gauge axles to allow inter-running between the  Shinkansen network, and the  narrow gauge regional rail network.

Two three-car and one four-car "GCT" electric multiple unit (EMU) trains have been built for testing. The first train operated from 1998 until 2006, the second train operated from 2006 until 2014 and the third-generation train commenced testing in 2014, although testing is currently suspended due to technical issues with the bogies. The GCT was due to be introduced on the Nagasaki Shinkansen upon its scheduled opening in fiscal 2022, but JR Kyushu announced in June 2017 that it had abandoned plans to adopt the GCT for these services.

First-generation train (1998–2006)

The first GCT train was completed in October 1998.

Formation
The train was formed as shown below, with all three cars motored.

Car 1 was built by Kawasaki Heavy Industries, car 2 was built by Kinki Sharyo, and car 3 was built by Tokyu Car Corporation.

History
From April 1999, the train was shipped to the Transportation Technology Center in Pueblo, Colorado, United States for an extended period of high-speed endurance running until January 2001.

From May to June 2003, the train was tested for the first time in Shikoku, running late at night on the Yosan Line between Sakaide Station and Matsuyama Station.

Withdrawal and preservation
Testing ended in 2006, after which the train was stored at JR Kyushu's Kokura Works. In April 2007, the train was moved to storage at JR Shikoku's Tadotsu Works. Two of the cars were cut up on-site, but one end car, number GCT01-1, was moved to Kawasaki Heavy Industries' Kobe factory in February 2014.

Second-generation train (2006–2013)

Initially scheduled to be completed in 2004, the second train was delivered in 2006, starting test running based at JR Shikoku's Tadotsu Works. In March 2007, the train was shipped from the RTRI in Kokubunji to Kokura Works, where it was shown off to the press in May 2007.

This train was based on the E3 Series Shinkansen, and included passenger seating in the intermediate car.

Formation
The train was formed as shown below, with all cars motored.

 Car 2 was fitted with 36 seats, tilting mechanism, and a pantograph.

History
From December 2007, test-running commenced on conventional tracks between Kokura Works and Nishi-Kokura Station.

In 2011, the train was fitted with new lighter weight "E" bogies to improve stability and ride comfort when negotiating curves or points with radii of less than 600 m. These replaced the previous "D" bogie design.

Withdrawal and preservation

The two other cars, GCT01-202 and GCT01-203, were cut up at JR Shikoku's Tadotsu Works in August 2014.

Third-generation train (2014–)

A third-generation, four-car, train was delivered to Kumamoto Depot in Kyushu in late March 2014, and "three-mode" (standard-gauge - gauge-changing - narrow gauge) endurance testing using a new facility built near Shin-Yatsushiro Station commenced in October 2014. Endurance testing was scheduled to continue until March 2017, accumulating a total distance of 600,000 km. Testing was suspended in December 2014 after accumulating approximating 33,000 km, following the discovery of defective thrust bearing oil seals on the bogies.

Formation
The train is formed as shown below, with all cars motored.

Cars 1, 3, and 4 were built by Kawasaki Heavy Industries in Kobe, and car 2 was built by Hitachi in Kudamatsu, Yamaguchi. Car 2 is equipped with a single-arm current collector. Seating accommodation is provided in car 2, arranged in eleven rows 2+2 abreast.

In June 2017, JR Kyushu revealed that it had abandoned plans to use the GCT on the Nagasaki Shinkansen, scheduled to open in fiscal 2022, citing reasons of cost and safety.

JR West plans
JR West planned to build a gauge-changing facility at Tsuruga Station as part of a proposal to operate a GCT from there to Osaka in conjunction with the extension of the Hokuriku Shinkansen from Kanazawa to Tsuruga opening in Fiscal 2022.  Also starting in fiscal 2014, the company designed and built a new six-car variable-gauge trainset, which was scheduled to be tested from fiscal 2016 on the standard gauge (1,435 mm) Hokuriku Shinkansen and narrow-gauge (1,067 mm) Hokuriku Main Line and Kosei Line. However, as a result of the abandonment of the proposed use of a GCT on the West Kyushu Shinkansen to Nagasaki by JR Kyushu, in August 2018 JR West announced that the proposed GCT between Tsuruga and Osaka had been abandoned.

See also
 Mini-shinkansen, the concept of converting narrow-gauge lines to standard gauge or dual gauge for use by Shinkansen trains
 Super Tokkyū, the concept of building narrow-gauge lines to Shinkansen standards
 Train on Train, an experimental concept for conveying narrow-gauge container wagons on Shinkansen tracks through the Seikan Tunnel
 Bradford Corporation Tramways

Further reading

References

External links

 Railway Technical Research Institute (RTRI)
 Ministry of Land, Infrastructure and Transport details 

Electric multiple units of Japan
High-speed trains of Japan
Kinki Sharyo multiple units
Kawasaki multiple units
25 kV AC multiple units
20 kV AC multiple units
1500 V DC multiple units of Japan
Tokyu Car multiple units